Stephanie S. Tolan (born 1942 in Ohio) is an American author of children's books. Her book Surviving the Applewhites received a Newbery Honor in 2003. She obtained a master's degree in English at Purdue University. Tolan is a senior fellow at the Institute for Educational Advancement. She lives in Charlotte, North Carolina, with her husband. Her papers are kept at the University of Central Missouri.

Bibliography

Children's books
 1978 Grandpa and Me Scribners
 1980 The Last of Eden, Warne
 1981 The Liberation of Tansy Warner, Scribners
 1981 No Safe Harbors
 1983 The Great Skinner Strike, Atheneum Books
 1983 A Time to Fly Free
 1986 Pride of the Peacock, Atheneum
 1987 The Great Skinner Getaway
 1987 The Great Skinner Homestead
 1988 A Good Courage
 1990 Plague Year, William Morrow
 1992 The Witch of Maple Park
 1992 Sophie and the Sidewalk Man
 1992 March Hooper and the Greatest Treasure in the World
 1993 Save Halloween William Morrow
 1994 Who's There?, HarperCollins
 1996 Welcome to the Ark (Volume 1 of the Ark Trilogy), William Morrow
 1996 The Great Skinner Enterprise
 1998 The Face in the Mirror, HarperCollins
 1999 Ordinary Miracles, HarperTeen
 2001 Flight of the Raven (Volume 2 of the Ark Trilogy), HarperTeen
 2002 Surviving the Applewhites 2003 Newbery Honor Book
 2004 Bartholomew's Blessing
 2006 Listen!, HarperCollins
 2009 Wishworks, Inc., Arthur A. Levine Books, 
 2012 Applewhites at Wit's End (Applewhites Family #2)

Books for adults
2011 Change Your Story, Change Your Life, Createspace.

Adapted works
The Bridge to Terabithia, a theatrical adaption of the 1977 book by Katherine Paterson

Contributing author
2008 Our White House: Looking In, Looking Out, produced by the National Children's Book and Literacy Alliance (various authors/illustrators). Candlewick Press

Foreword 
 2020 Connected: Intuition and Resonance in Smart People, by Alan D. Thompson.

Articles 
 2008 "What We May Be: What Dabrowski's Work Can Do for Gifted Adults" (in the book Living With Intensity, edited by Susan Daniels & Michael M. Piechowski)

References

External links
 
Lectures by Tolan at the National Association for Gifted Children
Tolan at publisher HarperCollins
Tolan at Our White House, National Children’s Book and Literacy Alliance
Stephanie S. Tolan Papers inventory at the James C. Kirkpatrick Library (University of Central Missouri), part of the Philip A. Sadler Research Collection of literature for children and young adults

 

1942 births
Living people
American children's writers
Newbery Honor winners
Writers from Charlotte, North Carolina
Purdue University alumni
University of Central Missouri people
20th-century American novelists
21st-century American novelists
20th-century American women writers
21st-century American women writers
American women children's writers
American women novelists
Novelists from North Carolina